Saint Paraskevi of Iconium (also known as Paraskeva Pyatnitsa) is venerated as a Christian virgin martyr.  According to Christian tradition, she was born to a rich family of Iconium.  Her parents were Christian, and Paraskevi was named as such (the name means "Friday" in Greek) because she was baptized on a Friday and because Friday was the day of Christ's Passion.

Paraskevi became a preacher, and according to tradition, converted a man named Antoninus to Christianity.  She was subsequently martyred at Iconium during the persecutions of Diocletian.

Veneration

An account of her martyrdom was written by John of Euboea.      
Paraskeva's cult and attributes became confused with that of other saints with the same name as well as pre-Christian deities of the Slavs.

As one scholar asks:

Was Parasceve, or Paraskeva, an early Christian maiden named in honor of the day of the Crucifixion?  Or was she a personification of that day, pictured cross in hand to assist the fervor of the faithful?  And was the Paraskeva of the South Slavs the same who made her appearance in northern Russia?

Paraskeva-Pyatnitsa "developed a personality and functions of her own on Russian soil."  Icons of the 13th-15th centuries from Novgorod depict Paraskeva as an ascetic figure wearing the red of martyrdom.  She holds an Eastern cross, a scroll professing her faith, or a vessel that holds the perfume of martyrdom.   She was depicted with St. Anastasia or St. Barbara or St. Juliana; sometimes she is depicted with male saints.

In Russia, Paraskeva-Pyatnitsa was the patroness of traders and fairs, and of marriage.

Eastern Slavs 

The image of the Great Martyr Paraskeva in the lands of the eastern Slavs was closely associated with the ancient cult of the pagan Mokosha, to whom women dedicated Friday afternoon. In the people the saint received the double name Paraskeva-Pyatnitsa.

The Slavs had the Great Martyr Paraskeva ( directly called Pyatnitsa, Pyatina, Petka. The Russified form of the name was also popular - Praskovya, diminutive. Parasha, Pana.

In Russian everyday life in the old days St. Paraskeva was so called: Paraskeva Friday''. From here went many churches "in the name of St. Friday. The word "Friday" almost became a feminine name in its own right, which could exist alongside Praskovia, like the names Warrior and Postnik.

In Serbia and Bulgaria they call "Sveta Petka" ("Saint Friday").

References

External links
 http://sv-paraskeva.if.ua/ Catholic source

Ante-Nicene Christian martyrs
Saints from Roman Anatolia
Ante-Nicene Christian female saints